The Heart of a Follies Girl is a lost 1928 American comedy film directed by John Francis Dillon and written by Dwinelle Benthall, Gerald Duffy, Charles Logue, and Rufus McCosh. The film stars Billie Dove, Larry Kent, Lowell Sherman, Clarissa Selwynne and Mildred Harris. It was released on March 18, 1928, by First National Pictures.

Cast      
Billie Dove as Teddy O'Day
Larry Kent as Derek Calhoun
Lowell Sherman as Rogers Winthrop
Clarissa Selwynne as Caroline Winthrop
Mildred Harris as Florine

References

External links
 
 

1928 films
1920s English-language films
Silent American comedy films
1928 comedy films
1928 lost films
First National Pictures films
Films directed by John Francis Dillon
American silent feature films
American black-and-white films
Lost American films
Lost comedy films
1920s American films